Łozy may refer to several places:
Łozy, Lubusz Voivodeship (west Poland)
Łozy, Masovian Voivodeship (east-central Poland)
Łozy, Warmian-Masurian Voivodeship (north Poland)